Jesse Bertrams (born 22 December 1994) is a Dutch professional football player who plays as a goalkeeper.

Club career
Bertrams made his professional debut as Jong PSV player in the second division on 28 October 2013 against SC Telstar in a 3-1 home win. He played the full game. During the 2013/14, he managed to play 6 games for Jong PSV.

He moved abroad in summer 2016 when he signed for Belgian second tier side Lommel United.

Personal life
His brother Nigel also played for PSV. Nigel Bertrams is at the moment goalkeeper at NAC Breda

References

External links
Netherlands profile at Ons Oranje

1994 births
Living people
People from Best, Netherlands
Association football goalkeepers
Dutch footballers
Netherlands under-21 international footballers
Jong PSV players
Eerste Divisie players
Lommel S.K. players
SC Cambuur players
AS Verbroedering Geel players
Challenger Pro League players
Dutch expatriate footballers
Expatriate footballers in Belgium
Dutch expatriate sportspeople in Belgium
Footballers from North Brabant